Nicolás Marambio Montt (13 June 1886 – 28 June 1936) was a Chilean politician and lawyer who served as President of the Senate of Chile.

External links
 BCN Profile

1886 births
1936 deaths
People from Huasco Province
Radical Party of Chile politicians
Deputies of the XXXIV Legislative Period of the National Congress of Chile
Presidents of the Senate of Chile
University of Chile alumni